KidZville may refer to several kids area at Cedar Fair amusement parks:

 California's Great America#KidZville, California's Great America
 Canada's Wonderland#KidZville, Canada's Wonderland
 Kings Dominion#Planet Snoopy, former kids area at Kings Dominion, merged with Planet Snoopy in 2013